"Fountains" is a song by Canadian rapper and singer Drake, featuring vocals from Nigerian singer Tems. It was released through Republic Records and OVO Sound as the sixteenth track from Drake's sixth studio album, Certified Lover Boy, on September 3, 2021. Produced by TRESOR, Monsune, and 40 who recorded and mixed the song.

Reception
Tim Sendra of AllMusic saw the "sunny" song as "one of the album's highlights", and Nathan Evans of Clash was reminded of Tems' feature on fellow Nigerian singer Wizkid's 2021 single, "Essence".

Charts

References

2021 songs
Drake (musician) songs
Songs written by Drake (musician)
Tems (singer) songs
Songs written by Tems (singer)
Song recordings produced by 40 (record producer)